Alexandre Letellier (born 11 December 1990) is a French professional footballer who plays as a goalkeeper for Ligue 1 club Paris Saint-Germain.

Career

Paris Saint-Germain 
Born in Paris, Letellier began his career with Paris Saint-Germain (PSG), and made 14 league appearances for the reserve team during the 2009–10 campaign.

Angers 
Letellier joined Angers in the summer of 2010, but failed to break into the first team in his first two years with the club. He made his professional debut in the 2–1 win over Nantes in the Coupe de la Ligue on 7 August 2012, and played his first Ligue 2 match for Angers later the same season, keeping a clean sheet in a 0–0 draw against Niort on 12 April 2013.

In January 2018, Letellier signed for Young Boys on loan until the end of the season. In the summer, would again be loaned out by Angers, this time to Troyes, and on a season-long loan. In July 2019, Letellier joined Eliteserien side Sarpsborg 08 on loan until the end of the year.

Orléans 
On 27 January 2020, Letellier signed for Orléans. He went on to make a total of six appearances as the club was relegated from the Ligue 2. He left on a free in the summer.

Return to Paris Saint-Germain 
On 25 September 2020, Letellier returned to Paris Saint-Germain. He signed a contract with the club that would expire on 30 June 2021. On that date, he signed a contract extension to keep him at PSG for a further year.

On 21 May 2022, in the last matchday of the 2021–22 Ligue 1 season, Letellier came on as a substitute in a 5–0 win over Metz at the Parc des Princes, making his debut for PSG. In the process, he became the 484th player to play for Paris Saint-Germain's first team, and was awarded a Ligue 1 winner's medal. On 6 July 2022, it was announced that Letellier had signed a new two-year contract with the club.

Personal life 
He has a son with his wife Chloé.

Career statistics

Honours 
Angers
 Coupe de France runner-up: 2016–17
Young Boys

 Swiss Super League: 2017–18
 Swiss Cup runner-up: 2017–18
Paris Saint-Germain

 Ligue 1: 2021–22

References

External links
 
 
 
 
 

1990 births
Living people
Footballers from Paris
French footballers
Association football goalkeepers
Paris Saint-Germain F.C. players
Angers SCO players
BSC Young Boys players
ES Troyes AC players
Sarpsborg 08 FF players
Ligue 1 players
Ligue 2 players
Swiss Super League players
Eliteserien players
French expatriate footballers
Expatriate footballers in Switzerland
French expatriate sportspeople in Switzerland
Expatriate footballers in Norway
French expatriate sportspeople in Norway